Yellow No. 5  is an EP by American alternative rock band Heatmiser, released in 1994 by record label Frontier between the albums Dead Air (1993) and Cop and Speeder (1994).

The EP was also released as a split cassette EP on Frontier Records, with Yellow No. 5 on side A and All Souls Alive by Australian rock band The Blackeyed Susans on side B (excluding the first four songs from All Souls Alive, which are also on side A).

Recording 
Yellow No. 5 was recorded in February 1994 at The Center for Applied Music and Media (C.A.M.M), except for "Wake", recorded in November 1992. (Another version of "Wake" appeared on the "Stray" single.) It was produced by Heatmiser, with the production being assisted by Eric Hedford, then of The Dandy Warhols (Heatmiser band member Tony Lash would later produce several of their records).

Reception 

Trouser Press opined that the EP had "more personality and varied approaches" than Dead Air. Nitsuh Abebe of AllMusic called the EP the group's most accessible and "poppy" release.

Track listing

Personnel 
 Heatmiser

 Neil Gust – vocals, guitar, sleeve art direction
 Tony Lash – drums, engineering
 Brandt Peterson – bass guitar
 Elliott Smith – vocals, guitar

 Technical

 Eric Hedford – production assistance
 Colin Burns – cover illustration
 J.J. Gonson – sleeve photography

References

External links 
 

1994 EPs
Heatmiser albums
Frontier Records albums